Digital ink may refer to:

 Digital inking, in animation
 Electronic paper
 E-ink, a technology for electronic paper common in e-books
 Windows Ink, a software suite for handwritten input in Microsoft products

See also 
 Active pen
 Digital pen
 Handwriting recognition
 Magnetic ink character recognition
 Pen computing
 Stylus (computing)